Alan Hewitt is an American composer, producer, recording and performing artist.  He served as keyboardist for The Moody Blues from 2010 until their break up in 2018. 
Hewitt was born in Petoskey, Michigan, United States,  and attended Berklee College of Music graduating in 1978. Hewitt served as a producer for over half a decade alongside Maurice White of Earth Wind and Fire (EWF) with the Greatest Hits album going platinum in 2000. Hewitt performed on the Cherry Pie record with Warrant, which went platinum in 2004.

Hewitt has released multiple solo albums and has written music for movies and television,; see below
Justin Hayward Live at Buckhead  
Alan Hewitt & One Nation Evolution
John Lodge 10,000 Light Years Ago
Spirit Rising Vol.2 with Earth, Wind & Fire & Beyonce – Columbia  
Earth, Wind & Fire Greatest Hits 
Earth, Wind & Fire The Promise 
Mary Fahl - co-production/arranging- Sony Classics
Earth, Wind & Fire Mega Mix 
Burning Bush – Co-produced Remix featuring Earth, Wind & Fire – Sony Music
That's The Way Of The World “Live”  Earth, Wind & Fire- keys- Sony Legacy
Warrant: “Cherry Pie” co-writer /arranger/keys- Columbia  
Godai – Kikuma Music/Japan with Maurice White co-Producer/arranger/keys
John Waite: “City By The Sea” – Edgar Allan Poe Society - writer/producer/keys
Apollonia Kotero - writer/producer/keys BMG 
Jonathon Butler: N2Encoded “Lost to Love” 
Jonathon Butler “I Believe”  NCoded.
Donny Osmond “Eyes Don’t Lie”  – Capitol   
The Morgans: Avex/Warner
Tanaka: Avex/Warner
Fiona: Atlantic Records

Diajiman Brothers: produced with Maurice White Columbia/Japan
Utherworlds-writer/producer/keys
Sakurako Mitsui: with Earth, Wind & Fire/Warner Bros. - producer/arranger (Gold in Japan)
Gavin Christopher: PANAM/Japan - producer/writer/keys
John Trudell: Ark 21/EMI writer/ produced with David Tickle
Ann Tickle: Ark 21/EMI with David Tickle (Included on Ark 21/EMI album “Out of the Blue” featuring          Sting, Peter Gabriel, Madonna, Seal, Jackson Brown, Julian Lennon and others)
Steven Seagal - producer
Blake Aaron 215 Records  produced/keys
The Ducks: (Best unsigned pop band – LA Weekly) produced with Dave Allard
“Not Here”: Musical Score for JFK Center  writer/producer
Steve Oliver / Global Kiss - SOM  piano, vibes, marimba
Greg Adam’s East Bay Soul  - co writer on “Awaken” 
Steve Oliver/World Citizen-SOM B-3

Awards
Hewitt won ESPY Award and a Golden Planet Award.

Discography

Studio albums
 1996 Native Heart   
 2000 Escape From Life  
 2004 Noche de Pasion  
 2006 Metropolis  
 2010 Retroactive  
 2012 High Fidelity  
 2015 Evolution (Alan Hewitt & One Nation)

Voyages Series
 1996 Kalahari 
 1996 Amazon Rain Forest  
 1996 Big Sur

Compilations, covers
 2008 Symphony in Rock

Soundtracks
 2010 Utherworlds

Other credits
 A Fall From Freedom -PBS.
 San Francisco Ocean Film Festival winner.
 Bridget Jones: The Edge of Reason (Universal) additional score.
 Gods and Generals (Warner Bros.) – arranger/instrumentalist.
 Swimming Upstream. 
 Swimming Upstream – composer trailer.
 Held Up. 
 She's So Lovely (Universal) – additional music for DVD.
 Happy Gilmore – additional music.
 Phenomenon – additional music.
 National Lampoon's Van Wilder 2: The Rise of Taj –additional music.
 An Owl's Song.
 Plight of the Pilot Whales.
 Shadow of the Red Giants
 Ten Lives “A Feral Cat Odyssey.
 Justin Hayward “Live at Buckhead Theatre”  keyboards, backing vocal.

Music for television
 Saturday Night Live - 2016.
 Taking it Off -Theme.
 Dancing With The Stars.
 ABC Primetime.
 E News Live.
 Twisted Tales Series. 
 Good Guys.
 Naked Science.
 Nate Berkus Show.
 Dr. Oz.
 Oprah's Next Chapter.
 Rosie.
 What Would You Do.
 Made.
 Oprah.
 Oprah's Big Give.
 Comedy Central.
 Celebrity Adventure.
 Nature – PBS.
 Survivor – Latin America (season 1).
 The Osbournes.
 Dead Like Me.
 Room Raiders. 
 Sky Sports-NFL.
 24-Fox promo.
 Nature – PBS.
 Bands Reunited – VH1 Series.
 Turks – CBS primetime series.
 Home Improvement.
 Wyland's Ocean World – Animal Planet – 13-part series.
 Nearly Famous.
 Stylemaker.
 Shipmates.
 You've Gotta See This – Fox Sports.
 Reach for the Sky – PBS.
 Wild On – E Channel.
 The Emotional World of Farm Animals-Genesis Award.
 EXTRA.
 Entertainment Tonight.
 True Hollywood.
 The National Enquirer.
 Inside The NFL.
 Best Damn Sports Show.
 General Hospital.
 Kentucky Derby.
 Squigglevision.
 The Rock -promo.
 World News Now.
 Special Delivery.
 Weekend Flash – Playboy.
 Fix My Celebrity Life.
 TV Guide Magazine Top 25 Best.
 The Good Guys.
 Zhi Qiang Ji Jin Wang-series in Hong Kong.
 World Watch-Japan.
 Yummy Yummy-Singapore.
 NFL Total Access.
 My Super Sweet Sixteen-UK.
 Transformers Prime.
 Sonic X.
 Justice League.
 Clean House.
 Super Soul Sunday.
 New Adventures of Nanobo.
 World's Deadliest.
 Super Soul Sunday.
 Queen Latifah Show.
 Little Couple.
 Oprah Where Are They Now ?

References

Living people
Songwriters from Michigan
Record producers from Michigan
Year of birth missing (living people)
People from Petoskey, Michigan
21st-century American keyboardists
Berklee College of Music alumni